Lee Sung (born 16 January 1980), also known as Lee Sung-man, is a South Korean professional golfer.

Lee played on the Nationwide Tour in the United States in 2001 and 2003. After losing his card on that tour in 2003, he was successful at the Asian Tour's qualifying school in January 2004, and he has played mainly in Asia since then. He picked up his first tour victory at the 2007 Bangkok Airways Open. He represented South Korea at the 2007 Omega Mission Hills World Cup with Lee Seong-ho.

Lee was born deaf. In November 2010 he underwent an operation to his right ear, his hearing is now restored.

Professional wins (1)

Asian Tour wins (1)

Asian Tour playoff record (0–1)

Team appearances
World Cup (representing South Korea): 2007

External links

South Korean male golfers
Asian Tour golfers
PGA Tour golfers
Deaf golfers
South Korean deaf people
1980 births
Living people